Events in the year 2018 in Kosovo.

Incumbents 
 President: Hashim Thaçi
 Prime Minister: Ramush Haradinaj

Events

Deaths 

 16 January – Oliver Ivanović, politician (b. 1953).
 9 June – Fadil Vokrri, footballer (b. 1960).

See also 

 2018 in Europe

References 

 
Kosovo
Kosovo
2010s in Kosovo
Years of the 21st century in Kosovo